Viktor Grigoryevich Tsaryov (2 June 1931 – 2 January 2017) was a Russian footballer.

Career
During his career he played for FC Dynamo Moscow (1954–1966). He earned 12 caps for the USSR national football team, and participated in the 1958 FIFA World Cup, as well as the first ever European Nations' Cup in 1960, where the Soviets were champions.

After retirement, he became a football manager. By 2008, he was the chairman of the board of directors of FC Dynamo Moscow.

Tsaryov died in Moscow on 2 January 2017 at the age of 85.

Honours
 Soviet Top League winner: 1955, 1957, 1959, 1963.
 Year-end Top 33 players list: 1957, 1959, 1963.
 Captained FC Dynamo Moscow in most games in franchise history (189 official league and cup games).
 Order of Friendship (1997)
 Order of Honour

References

External links
Profile (in Russian)

1931 births
Footballers from Moscow
2017 deaths
Russian footballers
Soviet footballers
Soviet Union international footballers
1958 FIFA World Cup players
1960 European Nations' Cup players
UEFA European Championship-winning players
Soviet Top League players
FC Dynamo Moscow players
Russian football managers
Soviet football managers
FC Dynamo Moscow managers
Honoured Masters of Sport of the USSR
Honoured Coaches of Russia
Recipients of the Order of Honour (Russia)
Association football midfielders
Association football defenders
Burials in Troyekurovskoye Cemetery